The Ministry for Internal Affairs of Buryatia (Министерства внутренних дел по Республике Бурятия) is the main law enforcement in Buryatia, Russia, also known as Buryatian Police (Полиция Бурятии).

Current Buryatian Interior Ministry is Aleksander Zaichenko.

Structure
Minister
Deputy Minister - Chief of Police
Deputy Minister
Deputy Minister - Chief of Investigations
Directorate for Personnel
Logistics
Deputy Minister - Chief of Operations
Deputy Minister - Chief of Public Security
Deputy Chief of Police
Chief of Criminal Investigations
Chief of Economic Security and combating the corruption
Chief of Public Security Protection and relations with the Government
Traffic Police (Управления государственной инспекции безопасности дорожного движения)
Ulan Ude City Police Department (Управления МВД России по г. Улан-Удэ)

External links
Official Website

Politics of Buryatia
Buryatia